Miami Project may refer to:
Miami Project to Cure Paralysis, an American research center devoted to research and treatment of spinal cord injuries and other causes of paralysis 
Miami Project, an annual art fair in Miami, since 2011, which has included participation by the Walter Maciel Gallery